Ivo Gelov (born 17 June 1968) is a Bulgarian rower. He competed in the men's eight event at the 1988 Summer Olympics.

References

1968 births
Living people
Bulgarian male rowers
Olympic rowers of Bulgaria
Rowers at the 1988 Summer Olympics
Rowers from Sofia